is a private university in Ōita, Ōita, Japan. The school was established in 1967 and adopted its present name in 1982.

External links
 Official website 
 NBU BRAVES 

Educational institutions established in 1967
Private universities and colleges in Japan
Universities and colleges in Ōita Prefecture